is a Japanese alpine skier. She competed in slalom, giant slalom, and alpine combined at the 1998 Winter Olympics in Nagano.

References

External links
 Official JOC profile 

1975 births
Living people
Japanese female alpine skiers
Olympic alpine skiers of Japan
Alpine skiers at the 1998 Winter Olympics
Asian Games medalists in alpine skiing
Alpine skiers at the 1996 Asian Winter Games
Medalists at the 1996 Asian Winter Games
Asian Games bronze medalists for Japan
Universiade medalists in alpine skiing
Universiade silver medalists for Japan
Competitors at the 1995 Winter Universiade
Competitors at the 1997 Winter Universiade
20th-century Japanese women